This list contains all cultural property of national significance (class A) in the canton of Lucerne from the 2009 Swiss Inventory of Cultural Property of National and Regional Significance. It is sorted by municipality and contains 83 individual buildings, 27 collections, 17 archaeological finds and 6 other, special sites.

The geographic coordinates provided are in the Swiss coordinate system as given in the Inventory.

Adligenswil

Alberswil

Altishofen

Beromünster

Buchrain

Buttisholz

Dierikon

Egolzwil

Emmen

Ermensee

Escholzmatt

Ettiswil

Gettnau

Geuensee

Greppen

Hasle

Hitzkirch

Hochdorf

Hohenrain

Horw

Inwil

Kriens

Luthern

Luzern

Malters

Marbach

Mauensee

Meggen

Meierskappel

Menznau

Neudorf

Nottwil

Pfaffnau

Reiden

Root

Rothenburg

Ruswil

Schötz

Schwarzenberg

Sempach

Sursee

Udligenswil

Vitznau

Wauwil

Werthenstein

Willisau

References
 All entries, addresses and coordinates are from:

External links
 Swiss Inventory of Cultural Property of National and Regional Significance, 2009 edition:

PDF documents: Class B objects
Geographic information system